Ajijic is a town about  west from the town of Chapala, part of the municipality (also named Chapala), in the State of Jalisco, Mexico. It is situated on the north shore of Lake Chapala, surrounded by mountains. Ajijic enjoys a moderate climate year-round. The population of Ajijic was 11,439 as of the 2020 census.

Geography

Due to Ajijic's tropical latitude and relatively high elevation, it is seldom unpleasantly hot or humid. The rainy season begins in June and lasts until October. Even during the rainy season, precipitation generally occurs during the evening or at night.

December and January are the coolest months, with nighttime lows just above . May is the hottest month, just before the beginning of the rainy season.

History

Up until the arrival of the Spanish, the region was occupied by nomadic Indian tribes, probably the Coca people that settled the northern shore. There seem to be many explanations, and meanings for the names Chapala and Ajijic, all of which are Indian place names, probably derived from Nahuatl, the native language of the area.

Ajijic, formerly spelled Axixic, means “place of water” or “place where water bubbles up” in Classical Nahuatl.  Don Andres Carlos and Fray Martin founded Ajijic in 1531 because it had a good source of water.  It is one of the oldest villages in Western Mexico.  By 1833 it is said to have had a population of no more than 2,000.

Ajijic has attracted foreign artists and writers since the 1890s. Englishmen Nigel Millet and Peter Lilley settled in Ajijic before World War II and under the pen name of Dane Chandos wrote Village in the Sun (1945, G.P. Putnam's Sons), about building a house on the edge of the lake in nearby San Antonio Tlayacapan. Using the same pen name, Peter Lilley later teamed up with Anthony Stansfeld (an English academic) to write House in the Sun (1949), which concerns the operation of a small inn in Ajijic (now known as the “Old Posada”). These books were written when the main road from Chapala was unpaved, ice was delivered by bus from Guadalajara, and electricity was just being installed.

Ajijic today 

The Ajijic population of about 11,000 excludes the hundreds of visitors from Guadalajara ( north) who spend weekends and vacations there.  Many retired Americans and Canadians now live in Ajijic, with an estimate that immigrants make up more than half of the population in the winter.

The influx of large numbers of immigrants has been received with mixed feelings by the local population. As the economy becomes more reliant on tourism, many businesses struggled when that population did not arrive in full strength due to the Covid-19 pandemic.

Ajijic is a very festive village with many holidays, special events and parades about once a month. Mexico's National Chili Cook-Off has been held in Ajijic since 1978 and attracts thousands of Mexican and international visitors each February. In addition to the cooking competition and chili eating, it attracts scores of vendors selling a large variety of items including art, crafts, clothing and novelties. Ajijic’s “Chupinaya Carrera de Montana” attracts about 500 males and females from all over Mexico each July for a grueling 13.8 kilometer foot race to the summit of Cerro La Chupinaya (2,400 meters, 7,874 feet) and back to the Ajijic Plaza in about 90 minutes for the best runners/climbers.  Hundreds are attracted each September to the unmanned Hot Air Balloon event (Regatta de Globos) where local groups enter their homemade tissue paper balloons some as big as 200 cubic feet.

The biggest local event of the year is the San Andreas Fiesta dedicated to Ajijic’s patron saint.  The Fiesta dominates Ajijic’s central plaza and surrounding streets for nine days in late November and attracts the majority of Ajijic residents.

On 1 December 2020, the town of Ajijic, located on Lake Chapala, was designated as the ninth Magical Town of Jalisco (Pueblo Mágico) by the federal tourism government.

References

External links

American diaspora in Mexico
Canadian diaspora in Mexico
Populated places in Jalisco